WFJA (105.5 FM) is a classic hits formatted radio station licensed to Sanford, North Carolina, US. The station is currently owned by Jon Lane Hackaday, through licensee Sandhills Broadcasting Group LLC.

References

External links
WFJA Classic Hits 105.5 Official Website
Official WWGP 1050 AM Official Website (Sister Station)

FJA